Arzén von Cserépy (1881–1958) was a Hungarian screenwriter, film producer and director who was based in Germany. He ran his own production company Cserépy-Film until it was merged into the larger UFA empire. von Cserépy became associated with a series of films about the Prussian monarch Frederick the Great. He was sometimes credited as Arzén Cserépy.

Selected filmography

Screenwriter
 The Armoured Vault (1914)
 Marshal Forwards (1932)

Producer
 Catherine the Great (1920)
 Mary Magdalene (1920)
 The Girl from Acker Street (1920)
 A Day on Mars (1921)
 Fridericus Rex (1922-1923)
 Old Heidelberg (1923)
 Strong Winds (1924)
 The Hymn of Leuthen (1933)

Director
 Seltsame Köpfe (1916)
 Colomba (1918)
 Pandora's Box (1921)
 Fridericus Rex (1922)
 The Hymn of Leuthen (1933)
 A Woman With Power of Attorney (1934)
 Don't Lose Heart, Suzanne! (1935)
 Landslide (1940)

Bibliography
 Kaes, Anton. Shell Shock Cinema: Weimar Culture and the Wounds of War. Princeton University Press, 2009. 
 Kreimeier, Klaus. The Ufa story: a history of Germany's greatest film company, 1918-1945. University of California Press, 1999.

External links

1881 births
1958 deaths
German-language film directors
Hungarian film directors
Film people from Budapest
Hungarian expatriates in Germany